The specklebelly keelback (Rhabdophis chrysargos) is a species of colubrid snake found in southeast Asia.

Food: Lizards, small mammals and birds
Size: Up to 600 mm
Distribution: the Philippines (Palawan), Borneo, Sumatra, Java, Bali
Habitat: Various forest
Poison: Harmless

References

Rhabdophis
Reptiles described in 1837
Taxa named by Hermann Schlegel
Reptiles of Brunei
Reptiles of Myanmar
Reptiles of Cambodia
Reptiles of Indonesia
Reptiles of Laos
Reptiles of Malaysia
Reptiles of the Philippines
Reptiles of Thailand
Reptiles of Vietnam
Snakes of Vietnam
Snakes of Asia
Reptiles of Borneo